The 1990 Commonwealth Final was the eighth running of the Commonwealth Final as part of the qualification for the 1991 Speedway World Championship. The 1991 Final was run on 10 June at the Norfolk Arena in King's Lynn, England, and was part of the World Championship qualifying for riders from the Commonwealth nations.

Riders qualified for the Final from the Australian, British and New Zealand Championships.

1991 Commonwealth Final
10 June
 King's Lynn, Norfolk Arena
Qualification: Top 11 plus 1 reserve to the 1991 Overseas Final in Bradford, England

* Todd Wiltshire replaced Glyn Taylor

References

See also
 Motorcycle Speedway

1991
World Individual
1991 in British motorsport
1991 in English sport
Commonwealth Final